Commander of the Ceylon Defence Force was the title of the head of the Ceylon Defence Force. The post was created in 1888, replacing the position of General Officer Commanding, Ceylon, and existed until 1949.

List of Commanders

See also
Sri Lanka Army
Commander of the Army

References

External links
Commandants

Ceylon Defence Force
Military history of Ceylon in World War II